The 2001 Coupe de France Final was a football match held at Stade de France, Saint-Denis on 26 May 2001, that saw RC Strasbourg defeat Amiens SC in a penalty shoot-out. After 120 minutes of play could not separate the two sides, the match went to penalties. Jean-Paul Abalo missed for Amiens, while José Luis Chilavert secured the victory for the Alsatian side.

Match details

See also
2000–01 Coupe de France

External links
Coupe de France results at Rec.Sport.Soccer Statistics Foundation
Report on French federation site

Final
2001
Coupe De France Final 2001
Coupe De France Final 2001
Coupe De France Final 2001
Coupe de France Final
Sport in Saint-Denis, Seine-Saint-Denis
Coupe de France Final